Sir Albert Costain (5 July 1910 – 5 March 1987) was a Conservative Party politician in the United Kingdom. He was Member of Parliament for Folkestone and Hythe from 1959 to 1983, preceding future Conservative leader Michael Howard.

Early career
Costain was educated at King James's School, Knaresborough and the College of Estate Management. He became production director on the formation of Richard Costain Ltd in 1933 and was later chairman of the company. The Sir Albert Costain Memorial Awards are awarded to trainee staff for successful achievement.

As MP
During his parliamentary career he was Parliamentary Private Secretary to the Minister of Public Building and Works from 1962 to 1964, to the Minister of Technology in 1970, to the Chancellor of the Duchy of Lancaster from 1970 to 1972, and to the Secretary of State for the Environment from 1972 to 1974.

Costain was also a member of the Speaker's panel of chairman in the House of Commons. He was knighted in July 1980.

Costain stepped down at the 1983 election, and died in 1987.

References

Times Guide to the House of Commons, 1979 and 1983 editions

External links 
 

1910 births
1987 deaths
Conservative Party (UK) MPs for English constituencies
UK MPs 1959–1964
UK MPs 1964–1966
UK MPs 1966–1970
UK MPs 1970–1974
UK MPs 1974
UK MPs 1974–1979
UK MPs 1979–1983
Knights Bachelor
Politicians awarded knighthoods
Alumni of University College of Estate Management